Vulich may refer to:

 Anglicization of the Slavic surname Vulić
 A Hero of Our Time